Hack may refer to:

Arts, entertainment, and media

Games
 Hack (Unix video game), a 1984 roguelike video game
 .hack (video game series), a series of video games by the multimedia franchise .hack

Music
 Hack (album), a 1990 album by Information Society

Film
 Hack!, a 2007 film starring Danica McKellar
 Hacked (film), a 2011 Bollywood thriller film
 The Den (2013 film), a 2013 American film also known as Hacked

Other uses in arts, entertainment, and media
 Hack (comedy), a joke that is considered obvious, frequently used, or stolen
 Hack (comics), a Marvel Comics Universe mutant character
 Hack (radio program), an Australian current affairs program
 Hack (TV series), an American television series
 .hack, a Japanese multimedia franchise
 Lifehacker, a weblog about life hacks and software

Computing
 Hack (computer science), an inelegant but effective solution to a computing problem
 Hack (computer security), to break into computers and computer networks
 Hack (programming language), a programming language developed by Meta
 HACK (tag), a possible tag in a comment in programming
 Hack (typeface), an open source typeface designed for source code editing
 Domain hack, a domain name that suggests a word, phrase, or name

Animals
 Hack (falconry), training method for young falcons
 Hack (horse), an animal used for pleasure riding, as well as the verb form (hacking, to hack) for the activity

Sports
 Hack, a piece of equipment used for traction in the sport of curling
 Hack, a goal in a game of hacky sack, or the footbag circle kicking game
 Hack squat, a variant of the squat exercise

Transport
 Hack, a motorcycle with a sidecar attached
 Hack, an illegal taxicab operation
 Hackney carriage, a London cab also known as a hack

Other uses
 Hack (masonry), a row of stacked unfired bricks protected from the rain
 Hack (name), a surname, given name and nickname
 Hack Circle, an amphitheatre in Christchurch, New Zealand, also known as Hack
 Hack writer or hack, a writer or journalist who produces low-quality articles or books
 Eduard Hackel (standard author abbreviation: Hack.) (1850–1926), Austrian botanist
 Life hack, productivity techniques used by programmers to solve everyday problems
 MIT hack, a clever, benign, and ethical prank or practical joke at the Massachusetts Institute of Technology
 Political hack, a person who devotes him/herself to party-political machinations
 Backslash, also known as hack

See also
 Hacker (disambiguation)
 Hacking (disambiguation)
 Hacks (disambiguation)